The September Convention was a treaty, signed on 15 September 1864, between the Kingdom of Italy and the French Empire, under which:
 French Emperor Napoleon III would withdraw all French troops from Rome within two years.
 King Victor Emmanuel II of Italy guaranteed the frontiers of the Papal States, which at the time consisted of Rome and Latium.

Additionally, in a protocol at first kept secret, the Italian government pledged to move its capital from Turin to another city (later selected by a commission to be Florence) within six months, to prove its good faith in giving up all claims on Rome.

Background
Benito Juárez was elected President of Mexico in 1861. In the aftermath of the Reform War (1858-1860), the country was left with a severely damaged infrastructure, crippled economy, and massive debt. Juárez not only continued the anti-clerical policies of the liberals, but, more importantly, canceled repayments of interest on foreign loans that had been taken out by the defeated conservatives. 

The establishment of a friendly monarchy in Mexico would ensure European access to Latin American markets; and French access to Mexican silver. To realize his ambitions without other European interference, Napoleon III entered into a coalition with Britain and Spain, while the U.S. was occupied with the American Civil War (1861–65), and unable to enforce the Monroe Doctrine. Spain, Britain and France, angry over unpaid Mexican debts, sent a joint expeditionary force that seized the Veracruz Customs House in December 1861. Spain and Britain soon withdrew after they realized that the French Emperor Napoleon III intended to overthrow the Juárez government and establish a Second Mexican Empire, with the support of the remnants of the Conservative side in the Reform War.

The significant investment of men and materiel gave Napoleon III a reason to reduce military commitments elsewhere, a reason that he expected would be acceptable to the French people.

Treaty
According to the terms of the treaty, Napoleon III would withdraw all French troops from Rome within two years; and King Victor Emmanuel II of Italy would guarantee the territorial integrity of the Papal States.

This treaty was opposed by the Pope, the French Catholics, and by Italian patriots. When the government’s move to Florence was announced, it caused widespread rioting in Turin, whose repression caused 55 dead and at least 133 wounded among the protesters; however, the King and the Italian government were duly transferred on 3 February 1865 (with the sovereign taking up residence at Palazzo Pitti). The last French troops left Rome in December 1866. Napoleon III hoped that the Italian government and Pope Pius IX would negotiate a compromise that would allow the government to move from Florence to Rome.

Because the intransigent Pius IX rejected all proposals, Italian patriots, under the leadership of Giuseppe Garibaldi, organized an invasion of Latium and Rome in October 1867. The patriots were defeated at Mentana by 2,000 French troops, sent by Napoleon III. A French garrison was kept in Rome to prop up the rule of Pius IX.

In August 1870, following the outbreak of the Franco-Prussian war, the French garrison was recalled from Rome. Widespread public demonstrations demanded that the Italian government take Rome. The Italian government took no direct action until the defeat of Napoleon III at the Battle of Sedan, after which the Italian government was no longer bound by the September Convention.  Victor Emmanuel sent Count Gustavo Ponza di San Martino to Pius IX with a personal letter offering a face-saving proposal that would have allowed the peaceful entry of the Italian Army into Rome, under the guise of offering protection to the Pope.

The Pope’s reception of San Martino (10 September 1870) was unfriendly.  Pius IX allowed violent outbursts to escape him. Throwing the King’s letter upon the table he exclaimed, "Fine loyalty! You are all a set of vipers, of whited sepulchres, and wanting in faith."  He was perhaps alluding to other letters received from the King.  After growing calmer, he exclaimed: "I am no prophet, nor son of a prophet, but I tell you, you will never enter Rome!" San Martino was so mortified that he left the next day.

The Italian Army, commanded by General Raffaele Cadorna, crossed the Papal frontier on 11 September and advanced slowly toward Rome, hoping that a peaceful entry could be negotiated. The Italian Army reached the Aurelian Walls on 19 September and placed Rome under a state of siege. Pius IX refused to surrender and the Papal Zouaves kept resisting.  On September 20, after a cannonade of three hours had breached the Aurelian Walls at Porta Pia, the Bersaglieri entered Rome and marched down Via Pia, which was subsequently renamed Via XX Settembre.  49 Italian soldiers and 19 Papal Zouaves died. Rome and Latium were annexed to the Kingdom of Italy after a plebiscite.  The Pope declared himself a "prisoner in the Vatican". The following year, the Italian government moved from Florence to Rome.

Historian Raffaele De Cesare made the following observations:
The Roman question was the stone tied to Napoleon’s feet--that dragged him into the abyss. He never forgot, even in August 1870, a month before Sedan, that he was a sovereign of a Catholic country, that he had been made Emperor, and was supported by the votes of the Conservatives and the influence of the clergy; and that it was his supreme duty not to abandon the Pontiff.

For twenty years Napoleon III had been the true sovereign of Rome, where he had many friends and relations [...] . Without him the temporal power would never have been reconstituted, nor, being reconstituted, would have endured.

Notes

References
 

Pope Pius IX
Modern history of Italy
History of the papacy
1864 in Italy
1864 treaties
Treaties of the Kingdom of Italy (1861–1946)
Treaties of the Second French Empire
France–Italy relations
September 1864 events